Bayana labordai is a species of South American mygalomorph spiders in the family Pycnothelidae. It is the only species in the monotypic genus Bayana. It was first described by F. Pérez-Miles, F. G. Costa & L. Montes de Oca in 2014, and is found in Uruguay and Brazil. Originally placed with the funnel-web trapdoor spiders, it was transferred to the Pycnothelidae in 2020.

See also
 List of Pycnothelidae species

References

Pycnothelidae
Spiders of South America
Spiders described in 2014